Archiminolia is a genus of sea snails, marine gastropod mollusks in the family Solariellidae, the top snails.

B.A. Marshall (1979) considered Ethaliopsis Schepman and Archiminolia Iredale  synonym with Microgaza Dall.

Description
The spire is moderately elevated. The teleoconch contains fine spiral cords. The subsutural cord sometimes contains nodules. The open, but not very broad umbilicus has no callus. The radula contains a broad latero-marginal plate.

Species
Species within the genus Archiminolia include:
 Archiminolia diplax Marshall, 1999
 Archiminolia episcopalis Marshall, 1999
 Archiminolia hurleyi (B. A. Marshall, 1979)
 Archiminolia iridescens (Habe, 1961) 
 Archiminolia katoi (Kuroda & Habe in Habe, 1961)
 Archiminolia meridiana (Dell, 1953)
 Archiminolia oleata (Hedley & Petterd, 1906)
 Archiminolia olivaceostrigata (Schepman, 1908)
 Archiminolia ostreion Vilvens, 2009
 Archiminolia regalis Marshall, 1999
 Archiminolia strobilos Vilvens, 2009
 Archiminolia wanganellica Marshall, 1999
 Archiminolia ziczac (Kuroda & Habe, 1971)

Species brought into synonymy
 Archiminolia alabida (B. A. Marshall, 1979): synonym of Bathymophila alabida (B. A. Marshall, 1979)
 Archiminolia dawsoni (B. A. Marshall, 1979): synonym of Bathymophila dawsoni (B. A. Marshall, 1979) (superseded combination)
 Archiminolia diadema Marshall, 1999: synonym of Bathymophila diadema (B. A. Marshall, 1999)
 Archiminolia fulgens (Dall, 1907): synonym of Ilanga fulgens (Dall, 1907) (superseded combination)
 Archiminolia ptykte Vilvens, 2009: synonym of Ilanga ptykte (Vilvens, 2009) (original combination)
 Archiminolia tenuiseptum Marshall, 1999: synonym of Phragmomphalina tenuiseptum (B. A. Marshall, 1999) (original combination)
 * Archiminolia zacalles (Melvill & Standen, 1903): synonym of Solariella zacalles Melvill, 1903
 Archiminolia zacaloides (Schepman, 1908): synonym of Ilanga zacalloides (Schepman, 1908) (superseded combination and misspelling of species name)

References

 Iredale, T (1929), Mollusca from the continental shelf of Eastern Australia, No. 2; Records of the Australian Museum v. 17 157–189. pls.38-41
 Cotton, B.C., 1959. South Australian Mollusca. Archaeogastropoda. Govt. Printer, Adelaide
 Iredale, T. & McMichael, D.F., 1962 [31/Dec/1962]. A reference list of the marine Mollusca of New South Wales. Mem. Aust. Mus., 11:0-0.
 Wilson, B., 1993. Australian Marine Shells. Prosobranch Gastropods. Odyssey Publishing, Kallaroo, WA

External links
 Williams, S.T., Kano, Y., Warén, A. & Herbert, D.G. (2020). Marrying molecules and morphology: first steps towards a reevaluation of solariellid genera (Gastropoda: Trochoidea) in the light of molecular phylogenetic studies. Journal of Molluscan Studies 86 (1): 1–26

 
Solariellidae
Gastropod genera